Wuhan Airlines (S: 武汉航空, T: 武漢航空, P: Wǔhàn Hángkōng) was an airline based in Wuhan of the People's Republic of China. In 2003, it merged into China Eastern Airlines.

Historical Fleet

4 Avia 14 Registration #: B-4209, B-4210, B-4211, B-4212 (B-4211 crashed near Lanzhou on 8 October 1992)
2 Boeing 737-36R Registration #: B-2969, B-2988
3 Boeing 737-3Q8 Registration #: B-2918, B-2919, B-2928
1 Boeing 737-3S3 Registration #: B-2976
2 Boeing 737-86R Registration #: B-2660, B-2665
5 Yunshuji Y-7 Registration #: B-3442, B-3443, B-3471, B-3472, B-3479
3 Xian MA60 Registration #: B-3430, B-3431, B-3432 (now under China Eastern Airlines colors)

Accidents and incidents
On October 8, 1992, Wuhan Airlines Flight 4211 a flight from Lanzhou to X'ian crashed into a hill while returning to Lanzhou due to an engine failure for unknown reasons, killing 14 of the 35 onboard. (5 of the crew died and 9 passengers died.)

On June 22, 2000, a Wuhan Airlines flight from Enshi to Wuhan was forced to circle for 30 minutes due to thunderstorms. The aircraft eventually crashed on the banks of Han River in Hanyang District, all on-board perished (there were varying accounts of number of crews and passengers). In addition, the crash also killed 7 people on the ground.

References

External links

Code and Fleet Data
Timetable Images

Companies based in Wuhan
Airlines disestablished in 2003
Defunct airlines of China
China Eastern Airlines
Transport in Wuhan
Airlines established in 1986
Chinese companies established in 1986
Chinese companies disestablished in 2003